The Unity Party (VP) is a political party in Azerbaijan led by Tahir Kərimli. It supports a resolution to the Nagorno-Karabakh conflict that restores the pre-conflict territorial boundaries of Azerbaijan.

History
The party was established in 1995. In April 2000 a breakaway led to the formation of the Unity Party II, which later merged into the Azerbaijani Popular Front Party. It supported Ilham Aliyev of the New Azerbaijan Party in the 2008 presidential elections.

In the 2015 parliamentary elections the party won a single seat, with Kərimli elected in the Ağsu-İsmayilli constituency.

References

1995 establishments in Azerbaijan
Political parties established in 1995
Political parties in Azerbaijan